Ben Rae (born 22 October 1986) is a New Zealand cricketer. He played in five first-class matches for Canterbury in 2007.

See also
 List of Canterbury representative cricketers

References

External links
 

1986 births
Living people
New Zealand cricketers
Canterbury cricketers
Cricketers from Christchurch